Geddes is a surname of English and Scottish origin. In Scotland and northern Ireland the name may be derived from the place-name Geddes in Nairn, Scotland. The Dictionary of American Family Names claims that the surname is more likely a patronymic name derived from the name Geddie, itself perhaps an altered form of MacAdam. In this way, the letter G represents the Scottish Gaelic mac "son of" and Eddie is a variant of Adam. Geddie may also be a nickname meaning "greedy", derived from gedd meaning "pike", this could also refer to a voracious eater. The earliest written record of the surname Geddes is of William Ged, from Shropshire, England, recorded within the Pipe Rolls in the year 1230. The surname Geddes can be represented in Scottish Gaelic as Geadasach and Geadais.

It has also been suggested that Geddes (Geadais in  Scottish Gaelic) is an earlier Gaelic spelling for Cádiz,  an ancient and important seaport in southern Spain (Latin Gādēs). This proposal for the origin of the surname Geddes is based on several lines of evidence connecting people and place names in Scotland with Jewish trading routes to France and Spain.

Surname
Alasdair Macintosh Geddes (born 1934), Scottish medical doctor and scientist who diagnosed the world's last reported fatality due to smallpox
Albert Geddes (1871–1935), New Zealand cricketer
Andrew Geddes (1783–1844), Scottish painter
Andrew James Wray Geddes (1906–1988), British Air Commodore responsible for the planning of Operation Manna
Andy Geddes (born 1959), Scottish footballer
Anna Geddes (1857–1917), British social environmental activist
Anne Geddes (born 1956), Australian-born photographer
Alexander Geddes (1737–1802), Scottish theologian and scholar
Auckland Geddes, 1st Baron Geddes (1879–1954), British politician and diplomat
Barbara Bel Geddes (1922–2005), American actress
Bobby Geddes (born 1960), Scottish footballer
Charles Geddes, Baron Geddes of Epsom (1897–1963), British entrepreneur and life peer
Eric Campbell Geddes (1875–1937), British politician and First Lord of the Admiralty during WWI
Euan Geddes, 3rd Baron Geddes, current Lord Geddes and Deputy Speaker of the House of Lords
George Geddes (engineer) (1809–1883), engineer, agricultural expert, and New York state senator
George W. Geddes (1824–1892), American politician, U.S. Representative from Ohio
James Geddes (engineer) (born 1763), American engineer and surveyor
James Lorraine Geddes (1827–1887), American soldier and writer
Jane Geddes (born 1960), American golfer
Jenny Geddes (c. 1600 – c. 1660), Scottish activist, arguably catalyzed the Wars of the Three Kingdoms
Jim Geddes (born 1949), American baseball pitcher
John J. Geddes (born c. 1945), Canadian author, poet, retired academic
John Maxwell Geddes (1941–2017), Scottish composer
Keith Geddes (born c. 1940s), Canadian computer scientist and academic
Ken Geddes, American football player
Leslie A. Geddes (born 1921), Scottish-born engineer and physiologist
Margaret Geddes, daughter of Lord Geddes, who married Prince Louis of Hesse and by Rhine, son of Ernest Louis, Grand Duke of Hesse
Margaret Geddes (born 1949), Australian writer and journalist
Margaret Geddes (artist) (1914–1998), British artist
Norah Geddes (1887–1967), Scottish landscape designer
Norman Bel Geddes (1893–1958), American theatrical and industrial designer
Patrick Geddes (1854–1932), Scottish biologist and town planner
Pytt Geddes (1917–2006), Norwegian-born tai chi teacher
Richard Geddes, American Academic
Sir Reay Geddes, former chairman of the Dunlop Rubber Company
Scott Geddes, Australian rugby league footballer
Wilhelmina Geddes (1887–1955), Irish stained glass artist
William Duguid Geddes (1828–1900), Scottish scholar and educationalist
William George Nicholson Geddes (1913–1993), Scottish civil engineer

Given name
Geddes Granger, also known as Makandal Daaga, Trinidad and Tobago political activist and former revolutionary
Geddes Rodgers, Artist Castlemaine Australia

See also
 Baron Geddes, title in the Peerage of the United Kingdom
 Clan Ged, Scottish clan
 Geddes (disambiguation), other things named Geddes
 Gaddy, a Scottish surname
 Kenneth Widmerpool, a central character in Anthony Powell's A Dance to the Music of Time novel sequence, "Geddes" being his grandfather's original surname.

References

English-language surnames
Scottish surnames
Toponymic surnames